Named for Vice-Admiral Robert FitzRoy, The Admiral Fiztroy Inn is located at 398 Thames Street in Newport, Rhode Island, in the Newport Historic District.

History
It was designed by architect Dudley Newton, and built in 1854.  It served as the home of the Sisters of Mercy Convent for nuns of St. Mary's church from 1854 to 1924, and later housed the first private Catholic school in Rhode Island, St Mary's Academy from 1854-1924. Jacqueline Bouvier and future U.S. President John F. Kennedy were married in St Mary's Church.

In 1986, the building was dismantled and moved from the original site, two blocks away on Spring Street, to the current location of 398 Thames Street. It now serves as the Admiral Fitzroy Inn.

Architectural style
The principal architectural style is Gothic, and the secondary is Italianate (according to the Historic Building Data Sheet Rhode Island Statewide Survey Phase 1 and the National Register of Historic Places nomination form for Newport Historic District).

Features
The eighteen rooms have decorative hand-painted walls. The Admiral Fitzroy Inn also has a conference room, a roof-top deck for guests, a small dining room, and a view of the ocean. There is off-street parking for guests.  There are some antiques displayed including an original Admiral Fitzroy Barometer that hangs in the lobby.

References

External links
 “Rhode Island - Newport County”. National Register of Historic Places. National Park Service (retrieved 2008-11-14)
 Admiral Fitzroy Inn (retrieved 2008-11-14)
 Jacqueline Lee Bouvier and John Fitzgerald Kennedy Wedding John F. Kennedy Presidential Library and Museum, (retrieved 2008-11-12)

Hotel buildings on the National Register of Historic Places in Rhode Island
Buildings and structures in Newport, Rhode Island
Hotels in Rhode Island
Historic district contributing properties in Rhode Island
National Register of Historic Places in Newport, Rhode Island